John K. Mara (born December 1, 1954) is the president, CEO, and co-owner of the New York Giants.

Early life
Mara was born in New York City and grew up in White Plains, a nearby suburb. He is the eldest son of Ann Mara (née Mumm) and late Giants owner Wellington Mara. Mara graduated from Iona Preparatory School in New Rochelle, graduated from Boston College in 1976 with a Bachelor of Science in marketing, graduating with Cum Laude honors. Mara earned his Juris Doctor degree from Fordham University School of Law in 1979. He specialized in labor and employment law and litigation at two Manhattan firms prior to joining the Giants.

Professional career

New York Giants

Mara joined the Giants in 1991, serving as General Counsel and later as Executive Vice President and Chief Operating Officer until his father's death in 2005, when he assumed the team's presidency. Mara and Tisch were at the forefront of the planning and negotiations for MetLife Stadium, which opened in 2010.

Under John Mara and Steve Tisch, the Giants have won Super Bowl XLII and Super Bowl XLVI.

Criticism
Despite winning two Super Bowls during his tenure as owner, Mara was criticized in the late 2010s and early 2020s for being too loyal to longtime Giants employees.

In September 2021, he was booed by fans while speaking at Eli Manning's number retirement and Ring of Honor ceremony, and didn't address the crowd that November when the team retired Michael Strahan's number.

Mara was also criticized for keeping Dave Gettleman throughout his four-year tenure, and instead allowing Gettleman to retire at the end of the 2021 season.

Additional work in NFL 
Mara has served for 15 years on the NFL Competition Committee, which suggests rule and policy changes to all NFL teams. He is the current chairman of the NFL Management Council Executive Committee. He played an important role in the negotiations for the 2011 and 2020 collective bargaining agreements. Mara, alongside Steve Tisch and Woody Johnson, brought Super Bowl XLVIII to MetLife Stadium in February 2014.

Personal life
Mara is the third generation of his family to own the Giants. His grandfather, Tim, founded the team in 1925. Tim's sons, Wellington and Jack (John's uncle), inherited the team in 1959, when Tim died. Among NFL franchises, only the Chicago Bears (controlled by the Halas-McCaskey family since 1921) have been in the hands of one family longer than the Giants.

He and his wife, Denise W. Mara, have one son, John Jr., and four daughters, Lauren, Courtney, Christine, and Erin.
He is also an uncle to actresses Rooney Mara and Kate Mara.

Mara serves on the Board of Directors of Saint Vincent's Hospital in Harrison, New York and Boys Hope Girls Hope of New York.

References

External links
New York Giants bio

1954 births
Carroll School of Management alumni
Fordham University School of Law alumni
Living people
Iona Preparatory School alumni
Mara family
National Football League team presidents
New York Giants executives
New York Giants owners
People from White Plains, New York